Nymphæum or Nymphaion was an ancient harbour on the coast of Illyria, three miles to the north of Lissus. The site has been identified with the area of modern day Shëngjin, Albania. Perhaps emerged since the 5th century BC, Nymphaeum was one of the earliest Greek colonies on the Albanian coast.

It was mentioned by Pliny the Elder (23 CE – 79), Lucanus (39 AD – 65 AD), Livy (59 BC – AD 17) and Julius Caesar (100 BC - 44 BC). The harbour of Nymphaeum was used by Marcus Antonius and his fleet when they arrived in Illyricum during Caesar's Civil War.

References

Bibliography 

Archaeology of Illyria
Ancient Greek archaeological sites in Albania
Former populated places in the Balkans
Greek colonies in Illyria
Illyrian Albania
Populated places in Lezhë
Shëngjin